Julia Leung Fung-yee, SBS is the Chief Executive Officer of the Securities and Futures Commission (SFC) of Hong Kong. She was formerly one of the undersecretaries appointed by the Government of Hong Kong in 2008.

Education
Leung holds a Bachelor of Social Sciences degree from the Chinese University of Hong Kong and a Master of Science degree in journalism from the Columbia University.

Career
Leung joined the Hong Kong Monetary Authority (HKMA) in 1994 and was promoted to Executive Director (External) in 2000.  She is a member of the Financial Services Advisory Committee of the Hong Kong Trade Development Council.   Before joining HKMA, she served on the Asian Wall Street Journal for 10 years. She has recently written a book called "The Tides of Capital". This book was published by OMFIF Press in January 2015. In this book Julia Leung distils two decades of financial diplomacy into an incisive account of the lessons Asia and the world have learned from successive bouts of crisis management. She entreats the west to take seriously the full implications of Asia's growing clout on the world economic stage. Leung calls on the US to share its dominant monetary position with others, especially China - a move towards a new monetary system and an overhaul of the governance of world finance.

Leung currently served as executive director, Investment Products upon joining the SFC in Hong Kong, and succeed Mr James Shipton as executive director, Intermediaries Division from 19 June 2016.

Undersecretary
In 2008 she was offered the opportunity to become an undersecretary for the Financial services and the treasury under the Political Appointments System. She possesses British citizenship.

References

Recipients of the Silver Bauhinia Star
Government officials of Hong Kong
Living people
Alumni of the Chinese University of Hong Kong
Columbia University Graduate School of Journalism alumni
1960 births